is a dam in Sekikawa, Niigata Prefecture, Japan, completed in 1961.

References 

Dams in Niigata Prefecture
Dams completed in 1961